The Anthony Wayne Bridge, commonly called the High Level Bridge, was designed by Waddell & Hardesty and constructed by the McClintic-Marshall Company in 1931, and is a downtown Toledo, Ohio landmark named after General Anthony Wayne. It is a suspension bridge that spans the Maumee River. The bridge has some features that give it a unique aesthetic quality, including a sky blue color and various lattice patterns.

Ohio State Routes 2, 51, and 65 cross the Maumee River on the Anthony Wayne Bridge; it also connects Clayton Street to Woodville Road.

The bridge was designated a historical civil engineering landmark by the American Society of Civil Engineers in 2022.

Reconstruction
In April 2012, the city of Toledo and the Ohio Department of Transportation announced a project that would close the bridge to traffic for nearly 2 years. The redevelopment project took nearly 3 years to complete and reopened in October 2015.

Dimensions
Deck width: 
Roadway width: 
Structure length: 
Center span: 
Total suspended length:

References

Bridges completed in 1931
Buildings and structures in Toledo, Ohio
Suspension bridges in Ohio
Transportation in Toledo, Ohio
Road bridges in Ohio
Steel bridges in the United States
1931 establishments in Ohio